The 1936 Manhattan Jaspers football team was an American football team that represented Manhattan College as an independent during the 1936 college football season.  In its fifth season under head coach Chick Meehan, the team compiled a 6–4 record and outscored opponents by a total of 145 to 92.

Schedule

References

Manhattan
Manhattan Jaspers football seasons
Manhattan Jaspers football